Tateidae is a family of very small and minute aquatic snails with an operculum, gastropod mollusks in the superfamily Truncatelloidea.

Genera
Genera within the family Tateidae:

Ascorhis Ponder & Clark, 1988
Austropyrgus Cotton, 1942
Beddomeia Petterd, 1889
Caldicochlea Ponder, 1997
Caledoconcha Haase & Bouchet, 1998
 Carnarvoncochlea Ponder, W.-H. Zhang, Hallan & Shea, 2019
Catapyrgus Climo, 1974
 Conondalia Ponder, W.-H. Zhang, Hallan & Shea, 2019
Crosseana Zielske & Haase, 2015
Edgbastonia Ponder, 2008
 Eulodrobia Ponder, W.-H. Zhang, Hallan & Shea, 2019
Fluvidona Iredale, 1937
Fluviopupa Pilsbry, 1911
Fonscochlea Ponder, Hershler & B. W. Jenkins, 1989
Hadopyrgus Climo, 1974
Halopyrgus Haase, 2008
Hemistomia Crosse, 1872
Indopyrgus Thiele, 1928
Jardinella Ponder & G. A. Clark, 1990
Kanakyella Haase & Bouchet, 1998
Kuschelita Climo, 1974
Leiorhagium Haase & Bouchet, 1998
Leptopyrgus Haase, 2008
Meridiopyrgus Haase, 2008
Nanocochlea Ponder & G. A. Clark, 1993
Novacaledonia Zielske & Haase, 2015
 Nundalia Ponder, W.-H. Zhang, Hallan & Shea, 2019
Obtusopyrgus Haase, 2008
Opacuincola Ponder, 1966
Paxillostium N. Gardner, 1970
Phrantela Iredale, 1943
Pidaconomus Haase & Bouchet, 1998
Platypyrgus Haase, 2008
Posticobia Iredale, 1943
Potamolithus Pilsbry, 1896
Potamopyrgus Stimpson, 1865
Pseudotricula Ponder, 1992
Rakipyrgus Haase, 2008
Rakiurapyrgus Haase, 2008
Sororipyrgus Haase, 2008
 Springvalia Ponder, W.-H. Zhang, Hallan & Shea, 2019
Strobelitatea Cazzaniga, 2017
Sulawesidrobia Ponder & Haase, 2005
Tatea Tenison Woods, 1879
Tongapyrgus Haase, 2008
Trochidrobia Ponder, Hershler & Jenkins, 1989
Victodrobia Ponder & G. A. Clark, 1993
Westrapyrgus Ponder, G. A. Clark & Miller, 1999

Genera brought into synonymy
 Fluviorissoina Iredale, 1944: synonym of Fluviopupa Pilsbry, 1911
 Pupidrobia Iredale, 1944: synonym of Fluviopupa Pilsbry, 1911

References

  Criscione F. & Ponder W.F. (2013) A phylogenetic analysis of rissooidean and cingulopsoidean families (Gastropoda: Caenogastropoda). Molecular Phylogenetics and Evolution 66: 1075–1082

 
Truncatelloidea